Stephen H. Hess (born April 20, 1933 in New York City) is a senior fellow emeritus in the Governance Studies program at the Brookings Institution. He studies media, the U.S. presidency, political dynasties and the U.S. government. He first joined Brookings in 1972 and was distinguished research professor of media and public affairs at the George Washington University (2004–2009). He served on Presidents Dwight D. Eisenhower and Richard Nixon's White House staff and as an adviser to Presidents Gerald R. Ford and Jimmy Carter.

Hess earned a B.A. in political science at Johns Hopkins University in 1953. Under United States President Dwight D. Eisenhower, Hess was a Special Assistant in the White House Office from February 20, 1959 until January 1961. As a Special Assistant in the White House Office, Hess’ principal duty was to draft speeches for the President and other spokesman for the Administration—inside Government and out. Other responsibilities assumed by Hess during his tenure in the White House included: acting as an advisor to the Republican National Committee’s “Committee on Programs and Progress”, helping to gather materials from various governmental departments and agencies for possible inclusion in the 1960 GOP platform, preparing bi-weekly reports concerning congressional action on the budget for legislative leaders’ meetings and sitting in on Republican congressional meetings about the 1959 Federal Airport Act.

Hess has also served as a fellow of Government at Harvard University (1979–82), as U.S. Representative to the United Nations General Assembly (1976) and the UNESCO General Conference (1974). From 1969 to 1971, he was the National Chairman of the White House Conference on Children and Youth, and was the Deputy Assistant to the President for Urban Affairs in 1969. He has worked in key consultant and adviser capacities for the Russell Sage Foundation, the German Marshall Fund, the Ford Foundation and the U.S. Government.

In 1977, Hess was elected as a fellow of the National Academy of Public Administration.

Hess is a member of the Senior Advisory Committee of the Shorenstein Center for Press, Politics, and Public Policy at the John F. Kennedy School of Government at Harvard University.

Recent written works include: American Political Cartoons: The Evolution of a National Identity (2010) and Whatever Happened to the Washington Reporters, 1978-2012 (2012), and a biography `Bit Player: My Life with Presidents and Ideas' (2018).

References

CNN.com: Political family names bring shame as well as fame

External links
Records of Stephen H. Hess, Dwight D. Eisenhower Presidential Library and Museum
Brookings biography page

Johns Hopkins University alumni
1933 births
Living people